Scalibregmatidae is a family of polychaetes belonging to the order Opheliida, and was first described by Anders Johan Malmgren in 1867.

Genera

Accepted genera:
 Asclerocheilus Ashworth, 1901
 Axiokebuita Pocklington & Fournier, 1987
 Hyboscolex  
 Lipobranchius 
Mucibregma  
Oligobregma 
Parasclerocheilus 
Polyphysia 
Proscalibregma 
 Pseudoscalibregma 
Scalibregma 
 Scalibregmella 
Scalibregmides 
Sclerobregma  
Sclerocheilus  
Speleobregma

References

Polychaetes
Taxa described in 1867